Megalobatrachonema is a nematode genus. Species of this genus are parasites of a number of amphibians including the rough-skinned newt''.

References 

Ascaridida
Chromadorea genera